Red Dead is a series of Western-themed action-adventure games published by Rockstar Games. The first entry in the series, Red Dead Revolver, was released on the PlayStation 2 and Xbox in May 2004. Originally developed by Capcom, Red Dead Revolver borrowed elements from their 1985 arcade title Gun.Smoke, to which it was intended to be a spiritual successor, but the game was cancelled in 2002. Subsequently, after acquiring the rights, Rockstar purchased Red Dead Revolver and expanded on it.

Red Dead Redemption, developed by Rockstar San Diego (which also worked on its predecessor), was released in May 2010 for PlayStation 3 and Xbox 360 to critical and commercial acclaim. Selling over 15 million copies by 2017 and winning many year-end accolades from multiple gaming publications, the game is considered to be one of the best games of all time. Multiple DLCs were added, including Undead Nightmare, a single-player expansion later released as a standalone game. A Game of the Year edition of the game includes all of the additional content.

Red Dead Redemption 2, developed by Rockstar Studios, was released on October 26, 2018 for PlayStation 4 and Xbox One, November 5, 2019 for Windows, and on November 19, 2019 for Stadia. The game was also widely acclaimed and a commercial success, generating $725 million in revenue in three days and selling 23 million copies in two weeks. Its online multiplayer component, Red Dead Online, was released in beta on November 27, 2018 to mixed reviews, with a full release on May 15, 2019, which received more positive reviews.

Games

Red Dead Revolver 

Red Dead Revolver is the first entry in the series, released for PlayStation 2 and Xbox in 2004. Set in 1880, during the American Old West, Red Dead Revolver follows bounty hunter Red Harlow as he uncovers the plot that killed his parents and exacts revenge on those responsible. In terms of canonicity to the Redemption followup series, Dan Houser suggested that Revolver is set in a separate universe, but a version of the events in the plot could still have taken place due to the nature of legends told in the Red Dead games' world.

Red Dead Redemption 

Red Dead Redemption is the second installment in the Red Dead series, and the spiritual successor to Red Dead Revolver. The game released in 2010 for PlayStation 3 and Xbox 360. The game takes place in the year 1911, during the decline of the American Old West and the Mexican Revolution. A spiritual successor to Red Dead Revolver, the game follows John Marston, a former outlaw, whose family is kidnapped by the Bureau of Investigation. In exchange for his family's return, John sets out to hunt down the surviving members of his former gang, in the process achieving closure and redemption for his past actions.

Undead Nightmare is a non-canonical expansion to Red Dead Redemption that follows John's efforts to find a cure for a zombie plague that has infected his family. A standalone disc, titled Red Dead Redemption: Undead Nightmare Collection, which does not require the original Red Dead Redemption game to be played, was released in North America on November 22, 2010.

Red Dead Redemption 2 

Red Dead Redemption 2 is a prequel to Red Dead Redemption and the third main entry in the series, released for PlayStation 4 and Xbox One in October 2018 and for Windows and Stadia in November 2019. Its story follows Arthur Morgan, a member of the infamous Van der Linde gang in 1899, in the waning years of the American Old West, and the extinction of the age of outlaws and gunslingers.  The game features several returning characters from Red Dead Redemption, including a younger and less-refined John Marston, his family, and fellow gang members Dutch van der Linde, Bill Williamson, and Javier Escuella. A lot of focus is put on Arthur's morality and relationship with other characters, primarily John, with whom he has a nearly brotherly-like bond, and Dutch, who slowly descends into madness as the gang faces more problems.  

Red Dead Online is the multiplayer component of Red Dead Redemption 2 and was released in May 2019, after several months in beta. Set one year before the single-player story, in 1898, it follows a customizable silent protagonist who is framed for murder and arrested. After being broken out of prison, the player is tasked by their rescuers with finding the true culprits in exchange for proving their innocence. Since release, the game has received several content updates that expanded upon the game modes, missions, and other activities players can partake in. A standalone client for the game was released in December 2020.

Future 
In October 2018, Dan Houser said that Rockstar might develop a future entry in the series depending on the success of Red Dead Redemption 2.

Common elements

Gameplay
In each game in the franchise, the player takes the role of an outlaw in the waning years of the American Old West. All three titles are third-person (although Red Dead Redemption 2 also gives the option to play in first-person), yet there are crucial differences between them. The first game in the series follows a linear storyline with fixed, limited locations. Red Dead Redemption, however, provides the player with an open world setting and gives them various options for exploration, random encounters and side-missions. Red Dead Redemption 2 is the biggest and most immersive of the three, providing far more options and activities for the player than in its previous titles. Combat and gunplay are a fundamental part in the franchise; players can cover, blind-fire, free-aim and can get into physical altercations with enemies. A large number of weapons are introduced in all three games, typically rifles and revolvers. Horses, stagecoaches and trains are the primary methods of transportation in all three games due to the period in which they are set.

Dead Eye
The trademark game mechanic of the series is the Dead Eye system, which bridges the gap between the protagonist's exceptional shooting prowess and the limitations of the human player's speed and coordination. For a short period, it allows the player to aim at targets in slow motion for better accuracy. After painting their targets, time goes back to normal as the player then attacks with a flurry of bullets in rapid succession. The Dead Eye system in Red Dead Redemption and Red Dead Redemption 2 has been refined, as it levels up as the game progresses, giving the player more options when using it.

Honor
Red Dead Redemption brings a new mechanic to the franchise that has been improved in Red Dead Redemption 2: a morality system where the player gains positive or negative "honor". Good deeds like saving townsfolk from danger will level up the player's honor, while malicious actions like harming innocents or committing theft will lower the player's honor. The player should be considerate of the honor system, as it can influence how the world interacts with the character.

Setting
All games in the series take place during the days of the Wild West. Red Dead Revolver takes place at an unidentified point in time during the 1880s, while Redemption is set primarily in 1911 (with the epilogue taking place in 1914), and Redemption 2 is set in 1899 (with the epilogue set in 1907). While Revolver's aesthetics and atmosphere are reminiscent of the films set during the Wild West, the other two games depict the final two decades of this time period, as new factories, machines, motor vehicles, and modern technology appear all throughout the United States, marking the modernization of society. In Redemption and Redemption 2, the map undergoes several changes between the two different time periods, such as new houses being built, and NPCs sporting new looks.

Red Dead Revolvers setting is quite transient, as Red moves from town to town throughout the game. The most prominent location is the town of Brimstone, which acts as a hub between several missions. The game takes place in the United States, in an unidentified region of mostly desert, although some levels also feature a forest or mountain setting.

Red Dead Redemption offers the player a more significant interaction with the environment, and its location is bigger than in the previous game. It ranges from canyons to deserts, but the player is unable to reach to the outer limit due to the borders surrounding the area (mountains and deep ravines). There are several towns and settlements that the player can visit, each with their own citizens (with whom the player can interact). The map spans two fictional U.S. states, New Austin (which is mostly desert) and West Elizabeth (which features lush forests and a mountain area), as well as the Mexican state of Nuevo Paraiso (which is also mainly a desert area).

Red Dead Redemption 2’s world is greatly expanded compared to its predecessor's, and is far more immersive, lifelike and responsive. Both New Austin and West Elizabeth from Red Dead Redemption make a return, although they have been expanded with new regions and towns, while three new states have been added: Ambarino (which is mostly a mountain wilderness), New Hanover (a wide valley that incorporates multiple small settlements, including the town of Valentine), and Lemoyne (composed of bayous and plantations, and the location of the small town of Rhodes and the large industrial city of Saint Denis).

Characters
The following list contains only main and supporting characters from the Red Dead franchise, who play a significant role in the narrative of the game(s) they appear in.

Note: A gray cell indicates that the character does not appear in that medium.

Reception 

The Red Dead series, particularly the second and third games, are critically acclaimed. Red Dead Redemption, averaging 95% on both review aggregate websites Metacritic and GameRankings, won numerous awards, including Game of the Year by GameSpy and GameSpot, and is considered to be one of the greatest games of all time. Reviewers praised the visuals, music, acting, open world gameplay and the story. A Game of the Year edition containing all additional content was released in October 2011. Red Dead Redemption 2, averaging 97% for both console platforms on Metacritic, was also widely acclaimed by critics, who praised the same aspects as well as its significant level of detail, winning a number of awards from publications.

Sales 
Red Dead Revolver sold 920,000 copies in North America as of July 2, 2010. Red Dead Redemption broke the records of its previous game, having shipped over 11 million copies by August 2011 and over 15 million copies by February 2017.Red Dead Redemption 2 however, marked the franchise's highest commercial achievement. In three days, the game generated $725 million in revenue, officially having the largest opening weekend in the history of entertainment, as well as being the second highest-selling entertainment launch, behind Grand Theft Auto V, another widely popular title from Rockstar Games. Two weeks after launch, the game shipped over 17 million units, thus exceeding its predecessors' lifetime sales. By September 2022, the two Red Dead Redemption games had shipped over 70 million units.

Notes

References

Further reading

External links

 
Rockstar Games franchises
Take-Two Interactive franchises
Video game franchises
Video game franchises introduced in 2004